Kirk Covington is a drummer best known for his work with the jazz fusion group Tribal Tech.

Covington was born in Midland, Texas, where he attended the University of North Texas College of Music, where he met bassist Gary Willis, with whom he later joined Tribal Tech. Covington has performed or recorded with other musicians including Joe Zawinul, Robben Ford, Allan Holdsworth, Scott Henderson, and John Humphrey.

Covington has toured since 1998 with Scott Henderson and bass player John Humphrey, as a trio. In 2003 they recorded Well to the Bone.

Covington continues to play with former Tribal Tech partner Scott Kinsey, was a member of the group Volto! where he also played keyboards, and in 2008 formed his own trio, "CPT KIRK", with keyboardist Scott Tibbs and bassist Rufus Philpot.

References

External links
http://www.erjn.it/mus/covington.htm 
http://www.drummerworld.com/drummers/Kirk_Covington.html

Living people
Year of birth missing (living people)
University of North Texas College of Music alumni
People from Midland, Texas
American drummers
Tribal Tech members